Bluestone railway station was a station in Norfolk, England. It was on the Midland and Great Northern Joint Railway between Corpusty and Aylsham North. It opened in the late 19th century, to serve the surrounding farms and settlements, and closed in 1916 owing to poor use.

It was located between the villages of Heydon and Oulton, with the station lying just within Heydon's civil parish. RAF Oulton, a now-disused airfield, was constructed in 1939-40 between the village of Oulton and the site of the station.

References

External links

OS map of Oulton and the railway in 1946
The station on a 1920s OS map

Disused railway stations in Norfolk
Former Midland and Great Northern Joint Railway stations
Railway stations in Great Britain opened in 1883
Railway stations in Great Britain closed in 1916